Else-May Norderhus (née Botten; born 16 August 1973, in Halsa) is a Norwegian politician for the Norwegian Labour Party. She was elected to the Storting from Møre og Romsdal county in 2009. She was deputy representative 2005–2009. In 2009, she was Møre og Romsdal Labour Party's 1st candidate to the Storting, and was elected as a representative.  She was re-elected in 2013 and 2017.

Norderhus has a background as secretary of the Norwegian Confederation of Trade Unions in the county since 1995. She was a member of the county council in Møre og Romsdal from 2003 to 2007. Norderhus grew up in Halsa in Nordmøre, and now lives in Molde in Romsdal.

On 26 October 2018, Norderhus was appointed by the Storting to be the new County Governor of Møre og Romsdal county.  Since she is currently a member of the Storting until 2021, she will not take office until her Parliamentary term is up in October 2021.  From 2019 until 2021, Rigmor Brøste was appointed as the temporary acting governor.

References

External links
 Else-May Botten at TV 2
 Personal blog

Members of the Storting
People from Møre og Romsdal
People from Molde
1973 births
Living people
Labour Party (Norway) politicians
Women members of the Storting
21st-century Norwegian politicians
21st-century Norwegian women politicians